Mitogen-Activated Protein Kinase Kinase Kinase 2 also known as MEKK2 (MEK/ERK Kinase 2) is an enzyme that in humans is encoded by the MAP3K2 gene.

Function 

The protein encoded by this gene is a member of serine/threonine protein kinase family. This kinase preferentially activates other kinases involved in the MAP kinase signaling pathway. This kinase has been shown to directly phosphorylate and activate IkappaB kinases, and thus plays a role in NF-kappa B signaling pathway. This kinase has also been found to bind and activate protein kinase C-related kinase 2, which suggests its involvement in a regulated signaling process.

Activation 
MEKK2 is activated through homodimerization and subsequent trans-autophosphorylation at MEKK2-S519.

MEKK2 is regulated by 14-3-3 proteins which bind to MEKK2-phosphoT283.

MEKK2 is regulated by SMYD3 which binds and methylates MEKK2-K260.

Interactions 

MAP3K2 has been shown to interact with:

 MAPK8,
 MAP2K4,
 MAP2K5, 
 MAP2K7, 
 14-3-3 protein,
 SMYD3,
 SH2D2A,  and
 XIAP

References

Further reading 

 
 
 
 
 
 
 
 
 
 
 
 
 
 
 

EC 2.7.11